Caragana acanthophylla is a species of flowering plants within the family Fabaceae. It is found in a number of countries across Asia including China, India, Kazakhstan, Kyrgizstan, Nepal, Pakistan and Tajikistan.

References

Hedysareae